Pinheirense Esporte Clube, or Pinheirense, as they are usually called, is a Brazilian football team from Icoaraci, district belonging to the city of Belém in Pará, founded on December 8, 1925.

Stadium
Pinheirense play their home games at Estádio Abelardo Conduru. The stadium has a maximum capacity of 5,000 people.

Women's team
In women's football, Pinheirense stands out as the best team in Pará. They are three titles of the Campeonato Paraense. In addition, the team achieved a fourth place in the Copa do Brasil de Futebol Feminino and a sixth place in the Campeonato Brasileiro de Futebol Feminino.

Honours
 Campeonato Paraense Second Division: 1
2016

External links
 Pinheirense in OGol.com

Association football clubs established in 1925
Football clubs in Pará
Belém
1925 establishments in Brazil